White Oak Creek is a  long 3rd order tributary to the New Hope River in North Carolina.  White Oak Creek joins the New Hope River within the B. Everett Jordan Lake Reservoir.

Variant names
According to the Geographic Names Information System, it has also been known historically as:  
 Whiteoak Creek

Course
White Oak Creek rises in a pond on the Beaver Creek and Crabtree Creek divide on the west side of Apex, North Carolina.  White Oak Creek then flows westerly to meet New Hope River in the B. Everett Jordan Lake Reservoir in Chatham County.

Watershed
White Oak Creek drains  of area, receives about 46.9 in/year of precipitation, has a topographic wetness index of 461.07, and has an average water temperature of 15.30 °C.  The watershed is 52% forested.

References

Rivers of North Carolina
Rivers of Chatham County, North Carolina
Rivers of Wake County, North Carolina